Paul Moss (October 2, 1908 – May 25, 1999) was a professional American football player who played wide receiver for two seasons for the Pittsburgh Pirates and the St. Louis Gunners.

An outstanding athlete, he excelled in multiple sports at Terre Haute's Gerstmeyer Tech High School, before becoming a multi-sport athlete for the Purdue Boilermakers.  
While at Purdue, Moss was twice named All-American (1931, 1932), he was a 2x All-B10 End & a 3-time (1930–32) letterman.  He appeared in the 1933 East-West Shrine Game before being drafted by the Pirates of the NFL.  He also played baseball for two seasons (1931, 1932).

He appeared in 10 games as a rookie and led the NFL in Receiving Yards (283 yds), he had 13 catches for a 28.3 yd/catch average and scored twice.
He spent the 1934 season with the St. Louis Gunners.

After his professional football career ended, he played at least one year (1935) in the Three-I League for his hometown Terre Haute Tots.

He entered the high school coaching ranks in Ohio and Minnesota, achieving a record of 56-19-1 (.743); his 1934 Maplewood (OH) High team won the County title behind future NFL star Paul Christman.  He won a conference title at Painesville's (OH) Harvey High

He was inducted into the Indiana Football Hall of Fame in 1976

References

External links

Pro Football Reference
Just Sports Stats
Fanbase profile

1908 births
1999 deaths
All-American college football players
American football ends
Sportspeople from Terre Haute, Indiana
Players of American football from Indiana
Purdue Boilermakers football players
Pittsburgh Pirates (football) players
St. Louis Gunners players
People from Brazil, Indiana
Purdue Boilermakers baseball players